Nine male athletes from India competed at the 1996 Summer Paralympics in Atlanta, United States.

See also
India at the Paralympics
India at the 1996 Summer Olympics

References 

Nations at the 1996 Summer Paralympics
1996
Summer Paralympics